Basic Education High School No. 4 Tarmwe, also known as BEHS No. 4 Tarmwe, is a public girls' school in Tamwe Township, Yangon, Myanmar.

Originally, it was a Christian school named St. Francis Girls' School, but it later became a secular school. The school is located immediately next to St. Francis of Assisi Catholic Church, Yangon. Beside the church is Basic Education High School No. 5 Tarmwe.

References

Tarmwe